Tatjana Manojlović (born 6 March 1966) is a Serbian journalist and politician. She has been a member of the National Assembly of Serbia since 1 August 2022.

Early life 
Manojlović was born on 6 March 1966 in Valjevo, SR Serbia, SFR Yugoslavia. She graduated from the Faculty of Political Sciences of University of Belgrade.

Career 
Manojlović has worked as a journalist for the Radio Television of Serbia. She is a member of the Democratic Party. She became one of the party's vice-presidents in 2021.

Manojlović was a candidate of the United for the Victory of Serbia coalition for the 2022 Serbian parliamentary election. She became a member of the National Assembly on 1 August 2022.

Personal life 
By profession, Manojlović is a political scientist. She has two children.

References 

1966 births
Politicians from Valjevo
Democratic Party (Serbia) politicians
Members of the National Assembly (Serbia)
University of Belgrade Faculty of Political Science alumni
Serbian journalists
Living people